Patrick Brian Clements (born February 2, 1962) is a retired professional baseball player who played eight seasons for the California Angels, Pittsburgh Pirates, New York Yankees, San Diego Padres, and Baltimore Orioles of Major League Baseball. Clements is a 1980 graduate of Pleasant Valley High School. He played baseball for three seasons at UCLA and was selected to the USA College All-Star team before being drafted by the Angels in June 1983. He was traded along with Mike Brown from the Angels to the Pirates for John Candelaria, George Hendrick and Al Holland on August 2 in a transaction that was completed two weeks later on August 16 when Bob Kipper was sent to Pittsburgh.

He was claimed off waivers by the Orioles from the Padres on July 9, 1992. His first win with the Orioles came in a twelve-inning 3–2 contest over the Chicago White Sox at Comiskey Park on July 20, 1992. After going 2–0 with a 3.28 earned run average (ERA) in 23 games with the Orioles, he elected to become a free agent on November 2, 1992.

Clements currently resides in Chico, California.

References

External links

1962 births
Living people
Major League Baseball pitchers
Baseball players from California
California Angels players
Pittsburgh Pirates players
New York Yankees players
San Diego Padres players
Baltimore Orioles players
Waterbury Angels players
UCLA Bruins baseball players
World Games gold medalists

Competitors at the 1981 World Games
Columbus Clippers players
Las Vegas Stars (baseball) players
Peoria Suns players
Rochester Red Wings players
Anchorage Glacier Pilots players